Rubem Dantas (born Salvador, Bahia, 1954) is a Brazilian jazz fusion percussionist. 

He is noted for his work with Camarón de la Isla, Paco de Lucía, Ramón de Algeciras, Chick Corea, Pepe de Lucía (he was part of the Paco de Lucía Sextet which formed in 1981), Carles Benavent, George Brown, Juan Ramirez, Manolito Soler, Joaquín Grilo, Duquende, Rafael de Utrera, Juan Manuel Cañizares, Viejín and José María Bandera.

References

1954 births
Living people
Brazilian jazz percussionists